Visio may refer to:

 Microsoft Visio, diagramming and vector graphics application
 Visio Corporation, acquired by Microsoft, developer of Microsoft Visio
 Dream vision or visio, a literary device

See also 
 Visio.M, a research project at the Technical University of Munich to develop concepts to produce electric cars that are efficient, safe, and inexpensive
 Vizio, a consumer electronics company